Guarulhos–São Paulo Metropolitan Corridor is a  long bus corridor, with 3 bus terminals and 19 bus stops.

History
The first projects of bus corridors to Guarulhos were made in the 1980s by EMTU, with the objective of connecting Line 1 - Blue with Guarulhos. In the beginning of the 2000s, the project TEU (Urban Express Transport) was launched, which predicted the connection of Tucuruvi, Vila Galvão, Vila Endres, Taboão and International Airport. Besides being included in the Urban Transports Integrated Plan (PITU), the project was paralyzed for years because of lack of funds until being divided in 5 phases:

 Phase I - Taboão-CECAP
 Phase II - CECAP-Vila Galvão
 Phase III - Vila Endres-Penha (Tiquatira)
 Phase IV - Vila Galvão-Tucuruvi
 Phase V - Taboão-São João

Currently, only Phases I and IV are concluded, while Phase II is partially concluded. Phase III is paralyzed due to negotiations with the Prefecture of Guarulhos and Phase V is in project.

References

External links
 METRA website
 São Paulo Secretariat of Metropolitan Transportation

Transport in São Paulo (state)
Empresa Metropolitana de Transportes Urbanos de São Paulo
Bus rapid transit in São Paulo (state)